Pablo Centrone (born 10 November 1957 in Buenos Aires) is an Argentine football manager. He is the current manager for Liga Nacional club Xinabajul.

External links
 Official website
 Once-onze.narod.ru

1957 births
Living people
Footballers from Buenos Aires
Argentine footballers
Argentine football managers
Club Atlético Atlanta managers
Club América managers
Independiente Santa Fe managers
Atlante F.C. managers
C.D. Veracruz managers
Club León managers
Expatriate football managers in El Salvador
Deportivo Morón footballers
C.D. Águila managers
Rochester Lancers (1967–1980) players
North American Soccer League (1968–1984) players
Association footballers not categorized by position
Deportivo Petapa managers